is an art museum located in Tama-ku, Kawasaki, Kanagawa, Japan. The Taro Okamoto Museum of Art mainly collects and preserves the works of Taro Okamoto, and his parents Kanoko and Ippei.

History 
Work began on the construction of the museum in November 1996, it was completed in July 1999, and the museum opened in October 1999.

Access 
 The museum is located approximately 17 minutes walk from Mukōgaoka-Yūen Station on the Odakyu Line.

References 
 Taro Okamoto Museum of Art, Home page

Art museums and galleries in Japan
Museums in Kanagawa Prefecture
Modern art museums in Japan
Art museums established in 1999
1999 establishments in Japan